Utukur Village Gram Panchayath is located in the south-eastern coastal region of India. The nearest Statutory Town is Gudur in  distance.

External links 

Villages in Nellore district